Hvorvarp is a settlement in Vesthimmerland located between Aars and Hornum in Ulstrup Sogn, Denmark.

The development is centered at intersections of roads  Hvorvarpvej, Jelstrupvej & Foldgangsvej (Vej means road). Himmerlandsstien passes and crosses Hvorvarpvej & Foldgangsvej. Himmerland railroad nearest stations to Hvorvarp have been either Hornum Station or Aars Station. In Hvorvarp lies crafts company  Tømrer-& Snedkerforretning ApS  A clothing store named Brudesalonen  that closed in 2012 it was on Jelstrupvej.

Featuring a peasant family from Hvorvarp mentioned in Johannes V. Jensens Himmerland History girl from Hvorhvarp.

References

Vesthimmerland Municipality
Towns and settlements in Vesthimmerland Municipality